The 53rd Division was created in February 1949 under the Regulation of the Redesignations of All Organizations and Units of the Army, issued by Central Military Commission on November 1, 1948, basing on the Independent Brigade of Yuwansu Military District, formed in December 1946.

The division was a part of 18th Corps. Under the flag of 53rd division it took part in the Chinese civil war. In 1950 the division entered Tibet with the Corps and took part in the Battle of Chamdo.

As of 1950 the division was composed of:
157th Regiment;
158th Regiment;
159th Regiment.

Since then the division was stationed in Tibet. 

In early 1950s, 308th Artillery Regiment was activated and attached to the division.

On 13 February 1952, its 158th Regiment was detached and was absorbed by 156th Regiment, 52nd Division. On 11 May, 156th Regiment returned to the division following 52nd Division's disbandment.

In 1953, the division was renamed as 53rd Infantry Division.

On 17 April 1957, the division was disbanded. As of disbandment the division was composed of:
156th Regiment;
157th Regiment;
159th Regiment;
308th Artillery Regiment.

References

Infantry divisions of the People's Liberation Army
Military units and formations established in 1949
Military units and formations disestablished in 1957